Pasheh Kan (also Romanized as Pasheh Kān and Pashahkān also known as Borj-e Pashgān, Pasheh Gān, Pashekān, and Pashkān) is a village in Emamzadeh Jafar Rural District, in the Central District of Gachsaran County, Kohgiluyeh and Boyer-Ahmad Province, Iran. At the 2006 census, its population was 562, in 129 families.

References 

Populated places in Gachsaran County